R. Clifton Spargo is an American novelist, short story writer, and cultural critic. He is the author most notably of the novel Beautiful Fools, The Last Affair of Zelda and Scott Fitzgerald (2013).

Life
Spargo is a graduate of the Iowa Writers’ Workshop, Yale Divinity School. Edinburgh University, and the doctoral program in literature at Yale University.

A past winner of Glimmer Train’s Award for New Writers as well as its Fiction Open Contest, he has been a Whiting Fellow in the Humanities, the Pearl Resnick Fellow at the United States Holocaust Memorial Museum, A Jackson Fellow at the Beinecke Library, and an Arts Fellow at the Iowa Writers’ Workshop.

His stories, have appeared in The Antioch Review, The Kenyon Review, Glimmer Train, FICTION, and elsewhere.  And his essays and reviews have appeared in venues such as The Yale Review, Raritan, The Cambridge Companion to Bob Dylan, The Oxford Handbook to Elegy, The Wall Street Journal, NewCity, Bookslut, the Chicago Tribune, The Atlantic, and The Huffington Post, for which he writes a blog called “The HI/LO” on the interplay between high and low culture, most specifically, about rock ‘n’ roll.

He has taught creative writing, literature, and ethics at Yale University, Marquette University, and the University of Iowa, and he was chosen as the Provost’s Visiting Writer in Fiction at the University of Iowa, 2013-14.  He co-created and leads a testimonial writing program for The Voices and Faces Project.  He recently served as the inaugural Dixon Professor of Creative Writing at Wittenberg University, 2014–15.

Works

Fiction
  Beautiful Fools, The Last Affair of Zelda and Scott Fitzgerald (The Overlook Press, 2013).

Nonfiction
 Vigilant Memory:  Emmanuel Levinas, the Holocaust, and the Unjust Death (philosophy) (The Johns Hopkins University Press, 2006).
 The Ethics of Mourning  (literary criticism) (The Johns Hopkins University Press, 2004).

References

External links
 www.beautifulfoolsthenovel.com 
 www.rcliftonspargo.com
 www.huffingtonpost.com/rcliftonspargo

21st-century American novelists
Living people
Year of birth missing (living people)
Place of birth missing (living people)
Iowa Writers' Workshop alumni
Yale Divinity School alumni
Alumni of the University of Edinburgh
Yale University faculty
Marquette University faculty
University of Iowa faculty
Wittenberg University faculty
American male novelists
21st-century American male writers
Novelists from Ohio
Novelists from Connecticut
Novelists from Iowa
Novelists from Wisconsin
21st-century American non-fiction writers
American male non-fiction writers